The Maldives competed in the 2014 Commonwealth Games in Glasgow, Scotland from July 23 to August 3, 2014.

Athletics

Men
Track & road events

Badminton

Singles

Doubles

Shooting

Men

Women

Swimming

Men

Women

Table Tennis

Singles

Doubles

References

Nations at the 2014 Commonwealth Games
Maldives at the Commonwealth Games
Common